Factology is an attempt to document the author's life as completely as possible, sometimes in diary form, and sometimes in pictures or photographs.  Some are associated with conceptual art.

Noted factologies
Buckminster Fuller: Dymaxion Chronofile
Janina Turek
Tehching Hsieh
Vivian Maier
Angelo Rizzuto

Memoirs